The white-headed worm lizard (Amphisbaena leucocephala) is a worm lizard species in the family Amphisbaenidae. It is found in Brazil and Uruguay.

References

Amphisbaena (lizard)
Reptiles described in 1878
Taxa named by Wilhelm Peters